Bora priča gluposti (trans. Bora's Talking Rubbish) is the recording of the poetry evening Serbian and former Yugoslav rock musician Bora Đorđević held in KST in Belgrade in May 1988, released on compact cassette through Helidon in 1988.

Track listing

Side A
"Gluposti" - 22:08

Side B
"Još malo gluposti" - 22:11

References
 Riblja čorba,  Jakovljević Mirko;  
 EX YU ROCK enciklopedija 1960-2006,  Janjatović Petar;  

Bora Đorđević albums
1988 live albums